is a passenger railway station located in the city of Yoshikawa, Saitama, Japan, operated by the East Japan Railway Company (JR East).

Lines
Yoshikawa Station is served by the orbital Musashino Line between Fuchūhommachi and Nishi-Funabashi, with some trains continuing to Tokyo via the Keiyō Line. It is located 48.2 kilometers from Fuchūhommachi Station and 77.0 kilometers from the official starting point of the line at Tsurumi Station.

Station layout
The station consists of two elevated side platforms serving two tracks, with the station building located underneath. The station is staffed.

Platforms

History
The station opened on 1 April 1973.

Passenger statistics
In fiscal 2019, the station was used by an average of 17,986 passengers daily (boarding passengers only).

Surrounding area

 Yoshikawa Police Station
 Yoshikawa City Office
 Saitama Yoshikawa High School

See also
 List of railway stations in Japan

References

External links

  

Railway stations in Japan opened in 1973
Stations of East Japan Railway Company
Railway stations in Saitama Prefecture
Musashino Line
Yoshikawa, Saitama